Belyayevsky (masculine), Belyayevskaya (feminine), or Belyayevskoye (neuter) is the name of several rural localities in Russia:
Belyayevsky (rural locality), a khutor in Ryazansky Rural Okrug of Belorechensky District of Krasnodar Krai
Belyayevskoye, Udmurt Republic, a village in Belyayevsky Selsoviet of Igrinsky District of the Udmurt Republic
Belyayevskoye, Yaroslavl Oblast, a village in Krutovsky Rural Okrug of Pervomaysky District of Yaroslavl Oblast
Belyayevskaya, Arkhangelsk Oblast, a village in Chadromsky Selsoviet of Ustyansky District of Arkhangelsk Oblast
Belyayevskaya, Kirov Oblast, a village in Denisovsky Rural Okrug of Slobodskoy District of Kirov Oblast
Belyayevskaya, Komi Republic, a village in Obyachevo Selo Administrative Territory of Priluzsky District of the Komi Republic
Belyayevskaya, Kharovsky District, Vologda Oblast, a village in Shevnitsky Selsoviet of Kharovsky District of Vologda Oblast
Belyayevskaya, Tarnogsky District, Vologda Oblast, a village in Shebengsky Selsoviet of Tarnogsky District of Vologda Oblast